Ahmed Ibrahim Kamel (born 1909, date of death unknown) was an Egyptian diver. He competed in the men's 3 metre springboard event at the 1936 Summer Olympics.

References

External links
 

1909 births
Year of death missing
Egyptian male divers
Olympic divers of Egypt
Divers at the 1936 Summer Olympics
Place of birth missing
20th-century Egyptian people